Mae Moore is a Canadian singer-songwriter. Her music is a blend of pop, folk and jazz. Her most successful album, 1992's Bohemia, was an international hit, although her other albums have been successful mainly in Canada.

Biography
Moore grew up in Brandon, Manitoba where she studied art before moving to British Columbia to pursue music. Her first hit came by co-writing the song "Heaven in Your Eyes" (with John Dexter), which would later be recorded by Loverboy for the Top Gun soundtrack in 1986. She then worked with Barney Bentall and Colin Nairne from the band Barney Bentall and the Legendary Hearts, providing background vocals on their self-titled 1988 album Barney Bentall and the Legendary Hearts.  She sang background vocals on and appeared in the music video for the Legendary Heart's "She's My Inspiration" song from that album.  Her association with Bentall and Nairne paid off, as CBS Records in Canada soon awarded her a recording contract.

Moore's debut album, Oceanview Motel, arrived in 1990. It was produced by Bentall and Nairne, and featured Vancouver-area musicians from both Barney Bentall & the Legendary Hearts and Spirit of the West.  Three singles were released including "I'll Watch Over You" which found some success on Canadian radio.  That same year she again worked with Bentall, providing vocals on the band's song "Life Could Be Worse" from the Lonely Avenue album.

In 1991, Moore was nominated for a Juno Award for "Most Promising Female Vocalist".  That year she travelled to Australia to write tracks for what would become her second album Bohemia.  There she collaborated with Steve Kilbey, the lead singer from the popular Australian band The Church, and the resulting recordings featured a more atmospheric sound than her first album.  Although Kilbey was producing the album, his ongoing drug addiction resulted in producer Gavin MacKillop being asked to complete the record, and Bohemia was released in 1992.

Moore's third and final studio album for CBS was 1995's Dragonfly. It featured her most successful single to date "Genuine", which reached No. 6 on the RPM "Top 100" singles chart in Canada.  Ironically, Moore was dropped from CBS just as she awarded a SOCAN award for the most airplay of that single.

Towards the close of the decade, Jann Arden asked Moore to record an album on Arden's label and the result was 1999's self-titled Mae Moore then followed by It's a Funny World, her first indie recording, released in 2000.

In 2002, Moore launched an occasional performing collaboration with folk musician Lester Quitzau.  Moore and Quitzau subsequently married in 2002.  Together they released an album in 2004 entitled Oh My!.  Her most recent appearance is a song on Quitzau's 2009 album The Same Light.

"Folklore", released in 2011, and Moore's second indie release, was nominated for two Canadian Folk Music Awards. "Folklore" is an ode to Canada, an exploration of friendship and for the first time features Moore on the Appalachian mountain dulcimer, an instrument that she has played since the mid-'70s. In fact, "Rain Song" was written in 1979 but never previously recorded. The record features Joby Baker (Cowboy Junkies, Alex Cuba), Rick May, Marc Atkinson, Daniel Lapp and Scott Sheerin.

Discography

Singles

Albums

References

External links
 Mae Moore – Official site for music

Living people
Canadian women singer-songwriters
Canadian singer-songwriters
Musicians from Brandon, Manitoba
Musicians from Vancouver
Canadian women pop singers
20th-century Canadian women singers
21st-century Canadian women singers
Year of birth missing (living people)